Huston Township is the name of some places in the U.S. state of Pennsylvania:

Huston Township, Blair County, Pennsylvania
Huston Township, Centre County, Pennsylvania
Huston Township, Clearfield County, Pennsylvania

Pennsylvania township disambiguation pages